Arturo Antonio Rodríguez (born 1915), nicknamed "Pollo", was a Cuban Negro league and Mexican League infielder. 

A native of Havana, Cuba, Rodríguez made his Negro leagues debut in 1935 with the Cuban Stars (East). He went on to play for the New York Cubans in 1939, and played in the Mexican League into the mid-1940s.

References

External links
 and Baseball-Reference Black Baseball stats and Seamheads

1915 births
Cuban Stars (East) players
New York Cubans players
Baseball players from Havana
Diablos Rojos del México players
Azules de Veracruz players
Baseball infielders